Rink Glacier, is a glacier in NW Greenland. Administratively it belongs to the Avannaata municipality.

This glacier was named after Danish geologist and explorer of Greenland Hinrich Johannes Rink (1819 - 1893).

Geography 
The Rink Glacier is located in the Lauge Koch Coast, Melville Bay. It originates in the western Greenland ice sheet and flows southwestwards between the Døcker Smith Glacier to the west and the Peary Glacier to the east. Its terminus lies ENE of Cape Murdoch, northeast of the Fisher Islands and north of the Balgoni Islands in Melville Bay.

See also
List of glaciers in Greenland

References

External links
Rink Gletscher, Retreat NW Greenland

Glaciers of Greenland